Protein disulfide isomerase family A member 2 is a protein that in humans is encoded by the PDIA2 gene.

Function

This gene encodes a member of the disulfide isomerase (PDI) family of endoplasmic reticulum (ER) proteins that catalyze protein folding and thiol-disulfide interchange reactions. The encoded protein has an N-terminal ER-signal sequence, two catalytically active thioredoxin (TRX) domains, two TRX-like domains and a C-terminal ER-retention sequence. The protein plays a role in the folding of nascent proteins in the endoplasmic reticulum by forming disulfide bonds through its thiol isomerase, oxidase, and reductase activity. The encoded protein also possesses estradiol-binding activity and can modulate intracellular estradiol levels. [provided by RefSeq, Sep 2017].

References

Further reading 

Endoplasmic reticulum resident proteins